The following lists events that happened during 2008 in East Timor.

Incumbents
President: José Ramos-Horta
Prime Minister: Xanana Gusmão

Events

January
 January 17 - President José Ramos-Horta urges Timorese to forgive and pray for former Indonesian president Suharto, who ordered the invasion of East Timor in 1975.
 January 25 - Monsoon storms have caused serious damage to homes and crops across East Timor, relief authorities say.
 January 30 - A 6.6-magnitude earthquake shakes Maluku, Indonesia, and triggers a tsunami alert, which is later lifted. The epicenter was on the sea bed about 160 miles northeast of Dili.

February
 February 4 - The United Nations has transferred authority to East Timorese police at three posts in Dili.
 February 11 - East Timorese President José Ramos-Horta is shot and seriously wounded in an attack at his home. Rebel leader Alfredo Reinhado, who led the attack, is killed. Gunman also attack a motorcade of Prime Minister Xanana Gusmão, but there are no injuries.

References

 
Years of the 21st century in East Timor
2000s in East Timor
East Timor
East Timor
East Timor